The Rivière des Îles Brûlées (in English: river of burned islands) is a tributary of the west shore of the Chaudière River which flows northward to empty onto the south shore of the St. Lawrence River. It flows in the municipality of Saint-Bernard, in the La Nouvelle-Beauce Regional County Municipality (MRC), in the administrative region of Chaudière-Appalaches, in Quebec, in Canada.

Geography 
The main neighboring watersheds of the Brûlées River are:
 north side: Bougie stream, Chaudière River;
 east side: Vallée River, Chaudière River;
 south side: Vallée River, Bras d'Henri, Beaurivage River;
 west side: Petit Bras d'Henri, Beaurivage River.

The Rivière des Îles Brûlées has its source in an agricultural zone northwest of the route du rang Saint-Henri, in the municipality of Saint-Bernard.

From its source, the Îles Brûlées river "flows over  divided into the following segments:
  north to a country road;
  north-east, to the route du rang Saint-Luc;
  northeasterly, up to the rang Saint-Georges-Ouest road which crosses the village of Saint-Bernard;
  west, up to the confluence of the Bougie stream;
  north, up to its confluence.

The Îles Brûlées river flows on the west bank of the Chaudière River, in Saint-Bernard. This confluence is located downstream of the bridge in the village of Scott and upstream of the Saint-Lambert-de-Lauzon bridge.

Toponymy 
The toponym Rivière des Îles Brûlées was formalized on August 8, 1977, at the Commission de toponymie du Québec.

See also 

 List of rivers of Quebec

References 

Rivers of Chaudière-Appalaches